"Would You Take Another Chance on Me" is a 1971 single by Jerry Lee Lewis.  "Would You Take Another Chance on Me" was Jerry Lee Lewis' fifth number one on the country chart.  The single stayed at number one for a single week and spent a total of sixteen weeks within the top 40.

The flip-side of the single was a cover of "Me and Bobby McGee" that was aimed at the pop market. The song peaked at No. 40 on the Billboard Hot 100. His first top 40 pop hit since 1961's "What'd I Say," "Me and Bobby McGee" was Lewis' last top 40 pop hit to date.

Chart performance

References

Jerry Lee Lewis songs
1971 songs
Songs written by Bill Rice
Song recordings produced by Jerry Kennedy
1971 singles
Songs written by Jerry Foster